Podkamennaya Tunguska is a rural locality (a village) in Borsky Selsoviet of Turukhansky District in Krasnoyarsk Krai, Russia, located at the confluence of the Podkamennaya Tunguska and Yenisei Rivers on the Yenisei River's side opposite to the settlement of Bor and the Podkamennaya Tunguska Airport. It had a population of 41 as of 2010.

Within the framework of municipal divisions, the village is a part of Borsky Rural Settlement in Turukhansky Municipal District.

References

Rural localities in Turukhansky District